Ilona Usovich (born 14 November 1982) is a Belarusian sprinter.

Together with Natallia Solohub, Anna Kozak and Svetlana Usovich (her sister) she won a silver medal in 4 x 400 metres relay at the 2004 IAAF World Indoor Championships. The next year Ilona finished 4th over 400 metres at the 2005 European Indoor Athletics Championships. For the 2006 IAAF World Indoor Championships, the Belarusian team had substituted Svetlana Usovich with Yulyana Zhalniaruk, and won a bronze medal.

She finished fifth in the 400 m final at the 2006 European Athletics Championships in Gothenburg and won a silver medal in the 4 × 400 m relay. The next year she won the 400 m silver medal and a 4 × 400 m relay gold medal at the 2007 European Athletics Indoor Championships.  In 2012, she won a bronze medal at the European Championships.

She has represented Belarus at the 2008 and 2012 Summer Olympics, as well as the 2005 World Championships in Athletics

References

1982 births
Living people
Belarusian female sprinters
Olympic athletes of Belarus
Athletes (track and field) at the 2004 Summer Olympics
Athletes (track and field) at the 2008 Summer Olympics
Athletes (track and field) at the 2012 Summer Olympics
World Athletics Championships athletes for Belarus
European Athletics Championships medalists
World Athletics Indoor Championships medalists
Olympic female sprinters
People from Chervyen
Sportspeople from Minsk Region